Bab El Jazira or Bab Dzira, in English "gate of island", is one of the gates of the medina of Tunis.

The gateway allows access to the southern suburb of the city of Tunis while the northern suburb, Bab Souika, is opened by the door of the same name.

This gate, demolished under the French protectorate, takes its name from Djerba. In fact, the merchants coming from that island arrived through this door.

References

Jazira